José María Gutiérrez Hernández (born 31 October 1976), known as Guti, is a Spanish former professional footballer who played as an attacking midfielder, currently a manager.

During his career, he played almost exclusively for Real Madrid – appearing in 542 official games and serving as vice-captain – helping the club to win 15 trophies, most notably three Champions League titles and five La Liga championships. He also competed professionally in Turkey, with Beşiktaş.

Guti played 13 times with Spain, making his debut in 1999.

Club career

Real Madrid
Born in Torrejón de Ardoz, Community of Madrid, Guti began playing for Real Madrid's cantera in 1986, initially as a striker but being later moved to midfield, and remained there for the vast majority of his career. On 2 December 1995 he made his first-team debut, in a 4–1 home win against Sevilla FC; he finished the season with one goal in nine appearances. 
 
Guti added two trophies to his cabinet in 1997, La Liga and the Supercopa de España, playing 17 competitive games during the campaign. In 1997–98 he helped the Merengues lift the UEFA Champions League and the Intercontinental Cup, while the player himself added the UEFA European Under-21 Championship.

1999–2000 started badly for Guti: struggling with the responsibility of replacing Clarence Seedorf, he was sent off for kicking a fallen adversary in a home fixture against Real Sociedad. This negative trait was often recurrent, as he was given his marching orders eight times during his career in the league alone. In the season, in which he also captured the Champions League, he scored six goals in 28 games. The following year he had his best individual input, netting 14 times and playing mostly as a striker due to injuries to Fernando Morientes, and contributing greatly to the team's 27th league title and subsequently another domestic Supercup.

Guti totalled eight goals in 63 games from 2001 to 2003, contributing three in nine matches as the 2001–02 Champions League ended in conquest. After the purchase of Ronaldo in summer 2002 he returned to midfield, and his scoring rate went down drastically.

Guti had his lowest season in terms of scoring in the 2004–05 season, as he failed to find the net for the first time in seven years with the first team; he only managed one official goal, in an international against San Marino in February 2005. In 2005–06, he played 43 games and netted six times (four in the league and two in European competition).

With the election of Ramón Calderón as club president and his subsequent vow to bring A.C. Milan's Brazilian star Kaká to Real Madrid, Guti's future at the Santiago Bernabéu Stadium appeared insecure. He was linked with a move away to cross-town rivals Atlético Madrid but, in the end, decided to stay with Real while Kaká stayed in Italy.

With Zinedine Zidane retired, Guti found himself as the creative playmaker for the 2006–07 campaign, his preferred position. His excellent short and through pass abilities, especially a performance in a 3–2 home win against Sevilla on 6 May 2007 in which he played just 32 minutes from the bench, contributed to many of the goals which helped Real Madrid become league champions for the 30th time.

On 10 February 2008, Guti scored two goals and provided four assists in a home game against Real Valladolid, for which he was named Player of the match– his team won the game 7–0 and ultimately lifted another champions trophy. On 14 September he netted their 5,000th league goal, in a 4–3 win over CD Numancia.

In 2009–10, already with Kaká on board, Guti still managed to appear significantly in the early stages, netting twice in the league. However, in late October, following the 4–0 shock defeat at AD Alcorcón in the round of 32 of the Copa del Rey, he allegedly insulted coach Manuel Pellegrini at half-time, being then left out of the playing squads for a lengthy period; after being reinstated he suffered with some injuries but, due to the Brazilian also having physical problems, managed to appear regularly until the season's end.

Beşiktaş

On 25 July 2010, Guti left Real Madrid after nearly 25 years of service; he said: "I have an offer from Beşiktaş JK, but I haven't decided yet". The deal was concluded the following day, with the player signing a two-year contract. He started in his first competitive match for the Istanbul-based club, assisting in the game's only goal against Bucaspor.

Guti contributed to Beşiktaş' victory against Galatasaray SK with one goal and one assist on 28 November 2010; it was the team's first win at the Ali Sami Yen Stadium in six years. On 11 May 2011, he started as they won the Turkish Cup against İstanbul Büyükşehir Belediyespor on penalties (4–3, 2–2 after extra time); it was the first domestic cup of his professional career.

Guti was deemed surplus to requirements at Beşiktaş for 2011–12, following the appointment of new manager Carlos Carvalhal. On 15 November 2011, the 35-year-old was released.

International career
A Spain international since 5 May 1999 (Spain–Croatia, 3–1), Guti nevertheless failed to appear in any tournament's final stage for his country, winning a total of 13 caps in approximately six years.

Previously, he won the UEFA European Under-18 Championship in 1995, followed by the under-21 one in 1998.

Coaching career
Guti announced his retirement from football on 21 September 2012, and said "I'm going to train to become a sporting director or a coach and I'd like to train youngsters... I'd really like to coach the Real Madrid youth team. That's my dream." He started working as a manager in 2013, going on to work with Real Madrid's youths for several years.

On 4 July 2018, Guti was named Şenol Güneş's assistant at former club Beşiktaş. On 5 November 2019, he was appointed head coach of Spanish Segunda División's UD Almería. The following February, he offered to resign and to refund his salary if rumours that he attended a nightclub with players after a defeat could be proven; on 26 June, he was sacked after a 0–1 home defeat to AD Alcorcón and replaced by Mário Silva.

Style of play
Originally a striker, Guti later developed into a talented playmaker, who was known in particular for his vision, technique, creativity, passing range and ability to provide assists for teammates; he also possessed an eye for goal courtesy of his ability to make late runs into the box. A versatile player, he was usually deployed as an attacking midfielder behind the forwards, which was his preferred position, but was also capable of playing as a second striker, a winger or in a defensive midfield role as a deep-lying playmaker. 

Despite his talent, Guti was known to be injury prone and also had a controversial character, which along with his turbulent personal life off the pitch led him to have difficulties with several of his managers throughout his career. He was also accused by certain pundits of being inconsistent and of having a poor work-rate.

Personal life
Guti married Arancha de Benito, a Spanish television celebrity, on 22 June 1999. The couple divorced after almost ten years of marriage and two children, Zaira and Aitor, but remained close friends; on 14 July 2016, he married Argentine TV presenter Romina Belluscio, who gave birth to his youngest son Enzo in 2013.

Guti's cousin, Javi Hernández, also played youth football for Real Madrid.

Other ventures
Guti played himself in two motion pictures, Torrente 3: El Protector and Goal II: Living the Dream. He also appeared in a 2005 documentary/movie about Real Madrid called Real, The Movie. He was a judge on the 2013 Spanish version of Celebrity Splash! on Antena 3.

Career statistics

Club

International

Scores and results list Spain's goal tally first, score column indicates score after each Guti goal.

Managerial statistics

Honours

Player
Real Madrid
La Liga: 1996–97, 2000–01, 2002–03, 2006–07, 2007–08
Supercopa de España: 1997, 2001, 2003, 2008
UEFA Champions League: 1997–98, 1999–2000, 2001–02
UEFA Super Cup: 2002
Intercontinental Cup: 1998, 2002

Beşiktaş
Turkish Cup: 2010–11

Spain U18
UEFA European Under-18 Championship: 1995

Spain U21
UEFA European Under-21 Championship: 1998

Individual
Copa del Rey top scorer: 2001–02
La Liga top assister: 2007–08

Manager
Real Madrid youth
División de Honor Juvenil de Fútbol: 2016–17
Copa de Campeones Juvenil de Fútbol: 2016–17
Copa del Rey Juvenil de Fútbol: 2016–17

References

External links

Real Madrid biography

1976 births
Living people
People from Torrejón de Ardoz
Spanish footballers
Footballers from the Community of Madrid
Association football midfielders
La Liga players
Segunda División players
Segunda División B players
Real Madrid C footballers
Real Madrid Castilla footballers
Real Madrid CF players
Süper Lig players
Beşiktaş J.K. footballers
UEFA Champions League winning players
Spain youth international footballers
Spain under-21 international footballers
Spain international footballers
Spanish expatriate footballers
Expatriate footballers in Turkey
Spanish expatriate sportspeople in Turkey
Spanish football managers
Segunda División managers
UD Almería managers